Charles Dewie English (April 8, 1910 – June 25, 1999) was a third baseman in Major League Baseball who played for the Chicago White Sox, New York Giants and Cincinnati Reds in a span of four seasons from 1932 to 1937.

References

External links
, or Retrosheet

1910 births
1999 deaths
Ballinger Cats players
Baseball players from South Carolina
Baton Rouge Red Sticks players
Chicago White Sox players
Cincinnati Reds players
Florence Pee Deans players
Fort Worth Cats players
Galveston Buccaneers players
Kansas City Blues (baseball) players
Los Angeles Angels (minor league) players
Major League Baseball third basemen
Milwaukee Brewers (minor league) players
Minor league baseball managers
Nashville Vols players
New York Giants (NL) players
Oakland Oaks (baseball) players
People from Darlington, South Carolina
Portland Beavers players